Inositol-tetrakisphosphate 1-kinase is an enzyme that in humans is encoded by the ITPK1 gene.

It is involved in inositol signalling pathways which regulate the conductance of calcium-activated chloride channels, and therefore could be relevant in the study of cystic fibrosis.

References

Further reading